David Bosworth is an American writer born in 1947.

Life
He graduated from Brown University. 
He teaches at University of Washington.

Awards
 1981 Drue Heinz Literature Prize
 Ingram Merrill Foundation Award

Works
 Conscientious Thinking: Making Sense in Post-Modern Times. University of Georgia Press, 2017. 
 The Demise of Virtue in Virtual America: The Moral Origins of the Great Recession. 2014. Front Porch Republic Books. 
   (short stories)

 "The Science of Self-Deception." Salmagundi Fall 1999/Winter 2000.

Anthologies

References

Year of birth missing (living people)
Living people
American male writers
Brown University alumni
University of Washington faculty